The Union Block, a building at 57 S. Main St. in Brigham City, Utah, was built in 1892.  It was listed on the National Register of Historic Places in 1991.

It is a two-part commercial block building.  It has also been known as the C.W. Knudson Building.

References

National Register of Historic Places in Box Elder County, Utah
Buildings and structures completed in 1892